The Rapiscan Systems Classic is a golf tournament on the PGA Tour Champions in southern Mississippi. It debuted  in 2010 at Fallen Oak Golf Club in Saucier, north of Biloxi. The tournament is sponsored by Rapiscan Systems.

The purse in 2019 was $1.6 million, with a winner's share of $240,000.

Winners

See also
Other Mississippi Gulf Coast golf tournaments:
Gulfport Open, a PGA Tour event,  played 1944–45
Mississippi Gulf Coast Classic, a Nationwide Tour event, played 1990–97
Mississippi Gulf Coast Open, a Nationwide Tour event, played 1999–2000

References

External links

Coverage on the PGA Tour Champions official site
Fallen Oak – golf

PGA Tour Champions events
Golf in Mississippi
Recurring sporting events established in 2010
2010 establishments in Mississippi